Michael Andrew "Mike" Dopita (born 28 October 1946, Kraslice, Czechoslovakia, died 22 December 2018, Canberra, Australia) was an Australian astronomer and Professor Emeritus at the Research School of Astronomy and Astrophysics, Australian National University, where he worked since 1975. He was the 1983 winner of the Pawsey Medal. He was elected Fellow of the Australian Academy of Science in 1996 and served as Treasurer of the Academy. He was president, Division VI, International Astronomical Union, from 1994 to 1997 and was a council member of the Astronomical Society of Australia between 1993 and 1996. He was a Fellow of that society. He was an Inaugural Federation Fellow of the Australian Research Council, 2001. He studied physics at Wadham College, Oxford.

Until 2015 he was editor in chief of the scientific journal Astrophysics and Space Science and author with Dr Ralph Sutherland of Astrophysics of the Diffuse Universe.

Dopita published over 650 research papers in refereed scientific journals.

He became a Member of the Order of Australia (AM) in the Australia Day 2013 honours list.

See also
 Eurasian Astronomical Society

References

External links
 Mount Stromlo and Siding Spring Observatories, rsaa.anu.edu.au  
 , Mike Dopita's home page

Members of the Eurasian Astronomical Society
2018 deaths
Fellows of the Australian Academy of Science
1946 births
Members of the Order of Australia
Alumni of Wadham College, Oxford